FK Radnik Surdulica is a professional football club based in Surdulica, Serbia. They compete in the Serbian SuperLiga, the top tier of the national league system.

History
The club was founded as Surdulički sportski klub (SSK) in 1926 on the initiative of Gradimir Antić, a local shoemaker, who brought the first football ball to Surdulica. They stopped operating with the onset of World War II and Axis occupation of Serbia. In 1946, the club was reestablished as FK Polet on the initiative of Borivoje Milenković and Božidar Stanković. They subsequently changed their name to FK Hidrovlasina in 1950. Later the same year, the club merged with FK Molidben from Belo Polje and was named FK Radnik.

In July 2008, the club merged with FK Železničar from Vranjska Banja, taking its spot in the Serbian League East. They spent the next five seasons in the third tier of Serbian football. After winning the title in 2013, the club was promoted to the Serbian First League. They spent the next two seasons in the second tier before placing first in the 2014–15 Serbian First League and earning promotion to the Serbian SuperLiga for the first time in their history. In the 2020–21 season, the club achieved its highest ever league finish of sixth place and also reached the semi-finals of the national cup.

Honours
Serbian First League (Tier 2)
 2014–15
Serbian League East (Tier 3)
 2012–13

Seasons

Players

First-team squad

Out on loan

Notable players
This is a list of players who have played at full international level.
  Samuel Owusu
  Witan Sulaeman
  Milan Purović
  Nedeljko Vlahović
  Nenad Lukić
  Milan Makarić
  Miljan Mutavdžić
  Miloš Simonović
  Nemanja Tomić
  Aleksandar Pantić
For a list of all FK Radnik Surdulica players with a Wikipedia article, see :Category:FK Radnik Surdulica players.

Managerial history

References

External links
 
 Club page at Srbijasport

1926 establishments in Serbia
Association football clubs established in 1926
Football clubs in Serbia